Fulton Shipyard  was a shipbuilding company in Antioch, California. The shipyard was founded in 1924 by Frank Fulton and Angeline Fulton Fredericks. To support the World War II demand for ships, Fulton Shipyard built minesweepers, tugboats, and troopships. The shipyard was located on the Stockton Channel at 701 Fulton Shipyard Rd, Antioch, near Antioch pier and the Antioch Dunes National Wildlife Refuge. The site was the former Jarvis Brothers, opened in 1918, then Laurtzen shipyard. In 1977 the site became the California Corporation. The shipyard closed in 1999 and the land is owned by the Fulton Family Trust. Fulton Shipyard was featured in a 1914 movie called The Stolen Yacht, a short drama film released on November 5, 1914. Frank Fulton and Angelines son James Lloyd Fulton (August 7, 1928 – August 25, 2011) became an operator of a Fulton Shipyard tugboat.

ATR-1 class rescue tug

ATR-1 class - ATR is the US hull classification symbol meaning Auxiliary Tug Rescue. The ATR-1 class was a Type V wooden-hulled rescue tug built by Fulton Shipyard in 1944 and 1945. The ATR-1 tugs serviced World War II in both Asiatic-Pacific Theater and the European theatre of World War II. The 40 ATR-1-class vessels had a displacement of 852 tons light and 1,315 tons fully loaded. The largest boom had a capacity of 4 tons. They were armed with one 3"/50 caliber gun and two single Oerlikon 20 mm cannon. The crew had five officers and 47 enlisted men. The propulsion was one Fulton Iron Works vertical triple-expansion reciprocating steam engine with two Babcock & Wilcox "D"-type boilers with a single propeller creating .

Small coastal transport
Fulton Shipyard built troopships of the APc-1-class small coastal transports design. The crew was composed of 3 officers and 22 enlisted men and could transport up to 66 troops. The vessels had a large boom with a capacity of 3 tons. They were powered by one Enterprise Engine DMG-6 diesel engine with a single propeller creating . For electrical they had two diesel 30 kW 120V D.C. service generators. The ship moved troops in the Pacific War.

Accentor-class minesweeper
A crew of 17 manned the ship and deck guns. Armament was a two .50 cal. M2 Browning machine guns. Accentor-class minesweepers were used to sweep naval mines in harbors, bays, and other littoral waters, due to their small size.

Agile-class minesweeper
The ship crew was 7 officers and 70 enlisted men. The minesweepers were armed with one Bofors 40 mm gun and two .50 cal (12.7 mm) twin machine gun.

Notable incidents
  ran aground in a typhoon and sank on October 9, 1945 in Nakagusuku Bay, Okinawa.
  grounded and destroyed on January 12, 1946 near Okinawa.
 The troopship APc-28 ran aground and burnt off Okinawa in 1946
 APc-102 was beached and lost at Saipan in 1945
 APc-103 was grounded and destroyed on December 2, 1945 off Okinawa in Nakagusuku Bay.

See also
California during World War II
Maritime history of California
 Wooden boats of World War 2
Cryer & Sons

References

American Theater of World War II
1940s in California
American boat builders
Ships built in Antioch, California
APc-1-class small coastal transports